William Bateman Bateman-Hanbury, 2nd Baron Bateman (28 July 1826 – 30 November 1901), styled The Honourable from 1837 until 1845, was a British peer and Conservative politician.

Background and education
Born William Hanbury at Kelmarsh, he was the son of William Bateman-Hanbury, 1st Baron Bateman and his wife Elizabeth, daughter of Lord Spencer Chichester, son of Arthur Chichester, 1st Marquess of Donegall. He was educated at Eton College and then Trinity College, Cambridge, of which he was MA. In 1837 he assumed by Royal licence the additional surname of Bateman.

Career
He succeeded his father in the barony in 1845 and took his seat on the Conservative benches in the House of Lords. Bateman-Hanbury joined the Leicestershire Yeomanry Cavalry as a cornet in 1847. Between 1858 and 1859 he served as a Lord-in-waiting (government whip in the House of Lords) in the Conservative administration of the Earl of Derby. In 1852, having been previously a Deputy Lieutenant, he was appointed Lord Lieutenant of Herefordshire, a post he held for almost fifty years until his death in 1901.

Family
Lord Bateman married Agnes Kerrison, youngest daughter of General Sir Edward Kerrison, 1st Baronet, on 13May 1854. They had four sons and six daughters. He died 30 November 1901, aged 75, and was succeeded in the barony by his son William. Lady Bateman died in 1918.

Publications
 Lord Bateman's plea for limited protection or for reciprocity in free trade with a preface by the author. A letter printed by The Times of 12 November 1877. 1878, London: William Ridgway, & Philadelphia: Henry Carey Baird & Co.

Arms

References 

1826 births
1901 deaths
Alumni of Trinity College, Cambridge
2
Eldest sons of British hereditary barons
Conservative Party (UK) Baronesses- and Lords-in-Waiting
Lord-Lieutenants of Herefordshire
People educated at Eton College
Leicestershire Yeomanry officers